Udara drucei is a species of butterfly of the family Lycaenidae. It is found in New Guinea.

Subspecies
Udara drucei drucei (Papua New Guinea: Owgarra, Aroa)
Udara drucei tennenti Müller, 2002 (New Ireland)

References

Butterflies described in 1906
Udara